Raewyn Connell (born 3 January 1944), usually cited as R. W. Connell, is an Australian sociologist. She gained prominence as an intellectual of the Australian New Left. She was appointed University Professor at the University of Sydney in 2004, and retired from her University Chair on July, 2014. She has been Professor Emerita at the University of Sydney since her retirement. She is known for the concept of hegemonic masculinity and her book, Southern Theory.

Life and career
Connell was born in Sydney, Australia. Her father, William Fraser (Bill) Connell (OBE), was a Professor of Education at the University of Sydney for many years, where she focused on educational research and teaching. Her mother, Margaret Lloyd Connell (née Peck) was a high school science teacher. Connell has two sisters, Patricia Margaret Selkirk and Helen Connell.

Connell was educated at Manly and North Sydney High Schools, and has degrees from the University of Melbourne and University of Sydney. She has held academic positions at universities in Australia, including being the founding professor of sociology at Macquarie University 1976–1991.

In the United States Connell was visiting professor of Australian studies at Harvard University 1991–1992, and professor of sociology at University of California Santa Cruz 1992–1995. She was a rank-and-file member of the Australian Labor Party until the early 1980s and a trade unionist, currently in the National Tertiary Education Union.

Connell's sociology emphasises the historical nature of social reality and the transformative character of social practice.  Her writing tries to combine empirical detail, structural analysis, critique, and relevance to practice.  Much of her empirical work uses biographical (life-history) interviewing in education, family life and workplaces. She has written or co-written twenty-one books and more than 150 research papers. Her work has been translated into over 15 languages.

Connell serves on the editorial board or advisory board of numerous academic journals, including Signs, Sexualities, The British Journal of Sociology, Theory and Society, and The International Journal of Inclusive Education.

Connell is a trans woman, who formally began transitioning late in life. Almost all her earlier work was published under the gender-neutral name "R. W. Connell" up to the second edition of  "Masculinities" in 2005. Since 2006 all her work has appeared under the name Raewyn Connell. Connell has also written about transsexualism.

Major contributions

Class and education
Connell first became known for research on large-scale class dynamics ("Ruling Class, Ruling Culture", 1977 and "Class Structure in Australian History", 1980), and the ways class and gender hierarchies are re-made in the everyday life of schools ("Making the Difference", 1982).

Gender

In the late 1980s she developed a social theory of gender relations ("Gender and Power", 1987), which emphasized that gender is a large-scale social structure not just a matter of personal identity. In this text, she proposed that the word "gender" be discussed in terms of three structures (power, production/labor and emotion/sexual relations). In applied fields she has worked on poverty and education, sexuality and AIDS prevention, and labor movement strategy. Connell and Messerschmidt collaborated on a piece, “Hegemonic Masculinity: Rethinking the Concept,” 2005, in response to the skepticism about the outcome that at her theory creates a fixed typology. In addition to supporting the categorization of her theories, Connell emphasizes the relationship between men and emotions. Connell argues that in today's society, men may be so emotionally disconnected that they are not conscious of their emotional states, such as depression. Many males have learned from their parents, friends, or other peers that they should not show emotion as it can be seen as a weakness. Once these boys become adults, they have developed the ability to suppress their emotional responses, such as crying or even sad facial expressions, to the point where they are really unaware of these emotions and unable to connect with them. One gender cannot be examined in isolation from another and emphasizes that there are disparities among males, even though neither one chooses the Postmodern practice of completely undermining this concept. Connell's writings emphasize the heterogeneous nature of masculinity. In contrast to feminism, masculine politics, according to Connell, cannot be a political movement. Women's marginalized identities frequently undergo positive evaluation on the part of feminists. On the other hand, authors on masculinity are almost always critical of the benefits that come with being a man.

Masculinity

Connell is best known outside Australia for studies of the social construction of masculinity. She was one of the founders of this research field, and her book "Masculinities" (1995, 2005) is the most-cited in the field. Hegemonic masculinity, a theory developed by Raewyn Connell, has had a significant impact on feminist sociology. In their critique of the sex-role theory, Connell and her co-authors claim that the emphasis on internalized norms, attitudes, and behaviors of society obscures structural inequalities and power dynamics and misrepresents the gendering process. For instance, girls and women are frequently expected to behave politely, be accommodating, and be caring. Men are typically supposed to be powerful, combative, and fearless. Gender role expectations exist in every country, ethnic group, and culture, although they can vary greatly among them. The concept of hegemonic masculinity has been particularly influential and has attracted much debate. She has been an advisor to UNESCO and UNO initiatives relating men, boys and masculinities to gender equality and peacemaking.

Southern theory
Connell has developed a sociology of intellectuals that emphasizes the collective character of intellectual labour, and the importance of its social context.  Her 2007 book Southern Theory extended this to the global dynamics of knowledge production, critiquing the "Northern" bias of mainstream social science which is predominately produced in "metropolitan" universities. In doing so, she argues, metropolitan social theory fails to adequately explain social phenomena in the Southern experience.

She analyzed examples of theoretical work deriving from the global South: including the work of Paulin Hountondji, Ali Shariati, Veena Das, Ashis Nandy and Raúl Prebisch.

Connell has also explored the implications of Southern Theory on gender theory, neoliberalism, and other global knowledge projects. She continues to argue in these contexts that historical power differentiations are maintained through imperialistic privileging of thought and that decolonizing this construction of knowledge can revolutionize societies across the globe. In her essay in Planning Theory for example, Connell calls for social science to accept subaltern views that have traditionally been ignored so that modern resources can be maximized in various fields such as urban planning, geography, and youth studies.

Criticism

In an essay titled "Under Southern Skies", Connell responded to four other scholars of sociology, namely Mustafa Emirbayer, Patricia Hill Collins, Raka Ray, and Isaac Ariail Reed, who had all written critically about her work on Southern Theory. While acknowledging how Connell's work has sparked important discussion, the arguments of these sociologists included Ray claiming that Southern Theory marks a tipping point for postcolonial sociology rather than global sociology, Reed finding Connell's theoretical concepts to be underdeveloped, Emirbayer's view that Connell tends to overgeneralize "Northern Theory" while making unfound claims about "Southern Theory", and Collins' identification of two issues: the centering of the North and the silencing of much of the Global South by only examining the theories of Southern educated elite. In her response, Connell responds to certain points from each argument to stand by her work, countering their criticism by explaining the decisions behind her writing and affirming that her work is a jumping-off point for further discussion.

Selected bibliography

References

External links
 

 A collection of papers by Raewyn Connell at XYonline
 

1944 births
Living people
Australian sociologists
Transgender writers
Transgender scientists
Transgender women
People educated at North Sydney Boys High School
Australian LGBT writers
Academic staff of the University of Sydney
Men and masculinities scholars
Medical sociologists
Social constructionism
Writers from Sydney
University of Melbourne alumni
Transgender academics
Transgender studies academics